In chemistry, indoxyl is a nitrogenous substance with the chemical formula: C8H7NO. Indoxyl is isomeric with oxindol and is obtained as an oily liquid.

Indoxyl is obtained from indican, which is a glycoside. The hydrolysis of indican yields β-D-glucose and indoxyl.

Indigo dye is a product of the reaction of indoxyl by a mild oxidizing agent such as atmospheric oxygen.

Indoxyl can be found in urine and is titrated with Obermayer's reagent. Obermayer's reagent is a dilute solution of FeCl3 in hydrochloric acid.

References

Indoles
Enols